Jonathan Anthony Nichols (born 10 September 1981) is an English former professional footballer.
 
Nichols signed for Torquay United on a YTS apprenticeship, making his debut whilst still an apprentice on 2 March 1999 in a 2–0 defeat away to Leyton Orient, with another five league appearances before the end of the season leading to him being awarded the club's Young Player of the Year Award. Although expected to make a breakthrough the following season, Nichols only made one further league appearance and was released at the end of the season, joining Dorchester Town on a free transfer in August 2000.

In the 2001 close season he joined Team Bath and won player of the year awards while studying at the University of Bath.

Nichols joined Rugby Town towards the end of the 2004–05 season, but left due to working in the South of England. He spent the 2005 pre-season with AFC Wimbledon, but returned to Rugby Town in August 2005.

In February 2006 Nicholls moved to London for work and joined Wingate & Finchley.

References

External links

Living people
1981 births
Footballers from Plymouth, Devon
English footballers
Association football defenders
Torquay United F.C. players
Dorchester Town F.C. players
Team Bath F.C. players
Rugby Town F.C. players
Wingate & Finchley F.C. players
English Football League players
Alumni of the University of Bath